Hannelore Emilie Käte Grete Schroth (10 January 1922 – 7 July 1987) was a German film, stage, and television actress whose career spanned over five decades.

Career
Born in Berlin in 1922, she was the daughter of popular stage and film actors Heinrich Schroth and Käthe Haack. Her older half-brother was actor and film director Carl-Heinz Schroth (1902–1989), who was the product of Schroth's father's earlier marriage to Else Ruttersheim.

Schroth began her career  as a child actress, and made her film debut at the age of nine in 1931's Max Ophüls' comedy Dann schon lieber Lebertran opposite her mother. Until age sixteen she attended drama school in Lausanne, Switzerland. Her early film successes include Spiel im Sommerwind (1938), Weisser Flieder (1939) and Kitty and the World Conference (1939) - the latter of which was her first leading role.

During World War II, Hannelore Schroth continued performing in films. Unlike her father, Heinrich Schroth, who was by then appearing in Nazi propaganda films such as the notorious 1940 anti-Semitic Jud Süß, she avoided overtly political films, such as her appearance in 1945's romantic drama Under the Bridges. After the war, she continued her work extensively in film and returned to the theatre, with engagements in Vienna, Düsseldorf, Hamburg, Berlin and Munich.

In addition to theatre and appearing in German films as an actress, in the 1950s Schroth began a career as a voice actress, dubbing  many English language films into German. Some of which include Jane Wyman's character of Carolina Hill in Just for You (1952),  Shirley MacLaine in Irma La Douce (1963), Elizabeth Taylor's role as Martha in Who's Afraid of Virginia Woolf? (1966) and Ingrid Bergman's role as Golda Meir in A Woman Called Golda (1982).

In her later years, Schroth began appearing on West German television, as well as appearing on stage and in film.

Awards
For her stage work, she received the 1969 Großen Hersfeld-Preis, and for work as an actress she was awarded the Filmband in Gold in 1980.

Personal life and death
Schroth was first married to German stage and film actor Carl Raddatz; the union ended in divorce. Her second marriage was to the Austrian deep sea diver Hans Hass, which produced a son, Hans Hass Jr. (1946–2009) who became an actor and pop singer. Her third marriage to lawyer Peter Köster produced a son, Christopher Kantapper Köster (1953–2012). Both of her sons committed suicide.

Schroth died in 1987 at the age of 65 and was interred at the Friedhof Heerstraße cemetery in Berlin.

Partial filmography

 (1931, short) - Ellen
Spiel im Sommerwind (1939) - Änne Osterkamp
The Governor (1939) - Ebba
Kitty and the World Conference (1939) - Kitty
Weißer Flieder (1940) - Anni Rössler
Friedrich Schiller – The Triumph of a Genius (1940) - Laura Rieger
Kleine Mädchen – große Sorgen (1941) - Ursula Hartung
Menschen im Sturm (1941) - Marieluise Kornberg
Seven Years of Good Luck (1942) - Hella Jüttner
 Sophienlund (1943) - Gabriele Eckberg
Liebesgeschichten (1943) - Felicitas / Beate Rechenmacher
Die schwache Stunde (1943) - Marion Austerlitz
 A Wife for Three Days (1944) - Lisa Rodenius
Seinerzeit zu meiner Zeit (1944) - Ingrid Peters
Under the Bridges (1946) - Anna Altmann
The Singing House (1948) - Melanie Cattori
Hallo – Sie haben Ihre Frau vergessen (1949) - Vera Schmitt
 Lambert Feels Threatened (1949) - Maria
Derby (1949) - Barbara Hessling
Kätchen für alles (1949) - Kätchen
 (1950) - Dorothee (voice)
The Beautiful Galatea (1950) - Leni Fink
Taxi-Kitty (1950) - Kitty Grille
Unschuld in tausend Nöten (1951) - Eva
Kommen Sie am Ersten (1951) - Inge Imhof
Das unmögliche Mädchen (1951) - Frl. Bimbi
The Prince of Pappenheim (1952) - Stefanie Vernon
The Daughter of the Regiment (1953) - Tony
Before Sundown (1956) - Ottilie Klamroth
The Captain from Köpenick (1956) - Mathilde Obermüller
 Like Once Lili Marleen (1956) - Klärchen Müller
Beloved Corinna (1956) - Dagmar Mansfeld
 (1957) - Gabriele Roscher
Voyage to Italy, Complete with Love (1958) - Miss Herzberg
The Man Who Couldn't Say No (1958) - Eva Träumer
Alle lieben Peter (1959) - Sylvia Erdmann
Sweetheart of the Gods (1960) - Uschi Gunzel
 Heaven, Love and Twine (1960) - Madame Riffi
 (1964) - Margot
Wir hau'n den Hauswirt in die Pfanne (1971) - Mathilde Zwicknagel
Emil i Lönneberga (1971) - Mrs. Petrell
New Mischief by Emil (1972) - Mrs. Petrell
Emil and the Piglet (1973) - Mrs. Petrell
 (1976) - Mama Sekulovich
 (1978) - Mrs. Almany
 (1979) - Oma Hedwig Lehner
Peaceful Days (1984) - Silvia
Herz mit Löffel (1987)

References

External links
 
LIFE magazine: Adolf Hitler: Up Close. Beauty Amid the Beasts

1922 births
1987 deaths
German film actresses
German stage actresses
German television actresses
German child actresses
Actresses from Berlin
20th-century German actresses
German expatriates in Switzerland